Scarlett O'Hara at the Crimson Parrot is a play by David Williamson. It was written as a vehicle for Caroline O'Connor.

It was the Melbourne Theatre Company's second most popular play in 2008.

Premise
Scarlett is a thirty-something waitress who lives with her mother and is obsessed with old movies. She has an active fantasy life and dreams of being with her boss, Steve, but is also pursued by the awkward Alan.

References

External links

Review of 2008 Melbourne production at Variety

Plays by David Williamson
2008 plays